Cinemawala  is a 2016 Indian Bengali language film directed by Kaushik Ganguly, and starring Paran Bandyopadhyay and Parambrata Chatterjee. The theme of the film is tribute to the single screen cinema halls that are rapidly becoming rare in India.

Plot summary

Pranabendu Bose, an aged man, owns a cinema hall named Kamalini. He is assisted by his long-time assistant Hari. Ever since the trend of digital viewing of cinemas by use of DVD and CDs have gained pace, Kamalini is facing loss. What infuriates Pranabendu the most is that his own son Prakash is engaged in selling illegal CDs and DVDs. The cinema-addict in Pranabendu believes cinema is fit to be seen only in the big screen, and therefore, curses Prakash for denigrating the medium of cinema by selling illegal DVDs. Pranabendu also fears that any day Prakash will be wound up by the police and that will burn his own hard-earned respect to ashes. Such is his disgust for Prakash that when local political leader Sudhanshu requests Pranabendu to stand in local panchayat elections, Pranabendu turns down the offer by saying he can't face questions from people regarding the illegal nature of the business which his own son runs. Beside the cinema hall, Pranabendu and Prakash attend to their long-time family business of distributing fish to vendors. Prakash's wife Moumita is expecting their first child. At home, Pranabendu and Prakash avoid speaking with each other. Moumita, though, takes good care of aged Pranabendu. One night, after returning from Kolkata with a bagful of illegal DVDs, Prakash notices an advertisement in the newspaper about a DVD home theater. Prakash buys a home theater by selling the golden bangles his mother Kamalini, who now lives separately from Pranabendu, gave to him on hearing of Moumita's pregnancy. Prakash, along with his business partner Ashim, arranges for the screening of blockbuster cinemas in the DVD home theater during the time of the local fair. Prakash's plan proves to be a masterstroke. The shows attract houseful audience.  He and his partner make loads of money in the process. The success of his son's illegal business breaks Pranabendu's heart. He orders Hari to sell off the projectors in his cinema hall. Next morning, Pranabendu visits the cinema hall in search of Hari. Hari informs him that a local businessman has agreed to buy the projectors which are still in good condition. Hari asks Pranabendu to allow him to stay in the cinema hall one last time. Unable to bear the sight of his beloved cinema hall coming to a close, Pranabendu leaves for home. At home, he counsels Prakash to mend his ways if he wishes to make his soon-to-be-born child proud and avoid getting arrested by the police. All of a sudden, police arrives in their home. They inform Pranabendu that Hari has committed suicide inside the hall by hanging himself from a ceiling fan. Pranabendu rushes to the hall to retrieve Hari's hanging body. Prakash accompanies Hari's dead body to the crematorium. Once everybody had left, Pranabendu locks himself up in his beloved cinema hall and burns it down, thus also killing himself

Thematic Representations in the movie:
The film tries to depict the present scenario of the world of Indian cinema and the effects of piracy, copyright infringement, and theft. Nowadays, due to the availability of the internet, we often do not realize that we are criminals of Intellectual Property Theft. Moreover, the artists who work so hard are not truly paid for their work as these sites providing us with the free songs and movies do not acknowledge the artists. As shown in the movie Pranabendu Bose is a victim to the modern-day technology. He is passionate about movies and his passion is not well understood by most of us in this generation including his own son, Prakash. Prakash sells illicit pirated movie CDs which angers Pranabendu so much so that the two do not speak living in the same house. Kamalini, the cinema hall owned by Pranabendu is abandoned as no one really goes to watch movies on the big screen and he ultimately burns down the hall with him in it in order to preserve the world of Cinema.

Cast 
 Paran Bandopadhyay as Pranabendu Das
 Arun Guhathakurta as Hari
 Parambrata Chattopadhyay as Prakash
 Sohini Sarkar as Moumita
 Lama as Ashim
 Bimal Chakraborty as Akhil
 Aloknanda Roy as Kamalini 
 Debaloy Bhattacharya as Sudhanshu

Awards
IFFI ICFT UNESCO Gandhi Medal at the 46th IFFI
'FCCI Special Mention Award' at HBFF-2016, "for directing the spotlight on the grave crisis engulfing  the celluloid art with the inevitable march of technology."

Awards and nominations

See also
Film Critics Circle of India
International Film Festival of India
Hyderabad Bengali Film Festival
BRICS Film Festival

References

External links 
 

2016 films
Bengali-language Indian films
2010s Bengali-language films
2016 drama films
Indian drama films
Films directed by Kaushik Ganguly